Forks Airport  is a city-owned, public-use airport located one nautical mile (1.85 km) southwest of the central business district of Forks, a city in Clallam County, Washington, United States. It was formerly known as Forks Municipal Airport.

Facilities and aircraft 
It has one runway designated 4/22 with an asphalt surface measuring 2,400 by 75 feet (732 x 23 m). It's equipped with medium intensity runway lighting. Approaches to both ends of this runway are visual.

For the 12-month period ending December 31, 2008, the airport had 13,600 aircraft operations, an average of 37 per day: 99.6% general aviation and 0.4% military. At that time there were 10 aircraft based at this airport: 50% single-engine, 30% helicopter and 20% ultralight.

References

External links 

 Forks Municipal (S18) at Washington State DOT
 Aerial image as of 19 July 1994 from USGS The National Map

Airports in Washington (state)
Transportation buildings and structures in Clallam County, Washington